A shield wall, also shield-wall or , refers to the highest and strongest curtain wall, or tower of a castle that defends the only practicable line of approach to a castle built on a mountain, hill or headland. There is often no clear, definitive distinction between a shield wall and a mantle wall.

Occurrence
Shield walls are found on many German and Austrian hill castles, but are not common in Great Britain or Ireland where the terrain of the rocky hills on which castles were built did not favour such constructions. However some castles in those areas built on headlands such as Tantallon and Old Head do have a similar feature.

Origin and description
The construction of shield walls was common in the late 12th century in Germany and Austria and may have been a reaction to the increasing use of heavy siege engines such as the trebuchet (the height of the walls protecting the buildings beyond from arching fire). Neuscharfeneck Castle). Behind the battlements at the top of the wall there was usually an allure or wall walk; the shield wall could also be flanked by two wall towers. In many cases the shield wall replaced the bergfried, for example in the ruined castle of Sporkenburg in the Westerwald forest or the ruins of the Alt Eberstein near the city of Baden-Baden. In other cases, for example at Liebenzell Castle, the bergfried was built in the centre of the shield wall.

Gallery

References

Sources

Further reading
 Horst Wolfgang Böhme, Reinhard Friedrich, Barbara Schock-Werner (ed.): Wörterbuch der Burgen, Schlösser und Festungen. Philipp Reclam, Stuttgart 2004, p. 228–230;
 Alexander Antonow: Burgen des südwestdeutschen Raums im 13. und 14. Jahrhundert – unter besonderer Berücksichtigung der Schildmauer. Verlag Konkordia, Bühl/Baden 1977, ;
 Friedrich-Wilhelm Krahe: Burgen des deutschen Mittelalters – Grundriss-Lexikon. Sonderausgabe, Flechsig Verlag, Würzburg 2000, p. 34−36;
 Friedrich-Wilhelm Krahe: Burgen und Wohntürme des deutschen Mittelalters, Band 1: Burgen. Jan Thorbecke Verlag, Stuttgart 2002, p. 33−36;
 Taylor, Robert (2009). The Castles of the Rhine: Recreating the Middle Ages in Modern Germany. 

Types of wall
Castle architecture